Kenton Ridge High School is a public high school near Springfield, Ohio, United States.  It is one of two high schools in the Northeastern Local School District, the other school being Northeastern High School.

State championships
Kenton Ridge High School has won the following Ohio High School Athletic Association state championship:
 Boys Bowling – 2009, 2010 
 Boys Golf - 2011

Notable alumni
 Dave Burba, Former MLB player (Seattle Mariners, San Francisco Giants, Cincinnati Reds, Cleveland Indians, Texas Rangers, Milwaukee Brewers) and current Minor League Baseball coach (Hartford Yard Goats)
 Adam Eaton, Current MLB player (Arizona Diamondbacks, Chicago White Sox, Washington Nationals)
 Jan Finney, softball player; professional MMA fighter
 Dustin Hermanson, Former MLB player (San Diego Padres, Montreal Expos, St. Louis Cardinals, Boston Red Sox, San Francisco Giants, Chicago White Sox)
 Chris Via, professional bowler on the PBA Tour, who has won the 2016 U.S. Amateur Championship and the 2021 U.S. Open
 Rick White, Former MLB player (Pittsburgh Pirates, Tampa Bay Devil Rays, New York Mets, Saint Louis Cardinals, Colorado Rockies, Houston Astros, Chicago White Sox, Cleveland Indians, Philadelphia Phillies, Cincinnati Reds, Seattle Mariners)

References

High schools in Clark County, Ohio
Public high schools in Ohio